Terence Robert Glynn (born 17 December 1958) is an English former professional footballer who played in the Football League as a forward for Orient. He notably scored 90 goals in 186 appearances for Wycombe Wanderers. As of 2021, Glynn has had a 50-year association with non-League club Flackwell Heath and has served the club as chairman, manager and groundsman.

Career statistics

References

1958 births
Living people
Footballers from the London Borough of Hackney
English footballers
Association football forwards
Leyton Orient F.C. players
Ilford F.C. players
Wycombe Wanderers F.C. players
Dartford F.C. players
Chelmsford City F.C. players
Dagenham F.C. players
Enfield F.C. players
Slough Town F.C. players
English Football League players
Flackwell Heath F.C. managers
Brentford F.C. players
Hendon F.C. players
Isthmian League players
English football managers